McClary Glacier is a glacier  long and  wide on the west coast of Graham Land, Antarctica. It flows southwest along the north side of Butson Ridge into Marguerite Bay between Cape Calmette and the Debenham Islands. The glacier was first roughly surveyed by the British Graham Land Expedition, 1936–37, and resurveyed by the Falkland Islands Dependencies Survey, 1946–50. It was named by the UK Antarctic Place-Names Committee for George B. McClary, father of Nelson McClary, mate on the Port of Beaumont during the Ronne Antarctic Research Expedition, 1947–48.

Further reading 
 Damien Gildea, Antarctic Peninsula - Mountaineering in Antarctica: Travel Guide 
 CHRISTOPH SCHNEIDER, Monitoring climate variability on the Antarctic Peninsula by means of observations of the snow cover, Annals of Glaciology 27 1998, P 624

References

Glaciers of Fallières Coast